

Location 
The Kunda or Akunda people are an ethnic group of Mambwe District of Eastern Province of Zambia. They number approximately at 250,000 people. They speak Chikunda, a Bantu language closely related to Bisa and Nsenga.

Most Kunda live on the eastern bank of the Luangwa River near South Luangwa National Park. Every August, they celebrate an annual festival called the Malaila Traditional Ceremony.

History of the Kunda People (By William Vwapu) 
Origins of the Kunda People

Dr. Francisco José de Lacerda e Almeida (1753 – 18 October 1798) the Portuguese explorer who led a Portuguese expedition to the Kazembe region of Zambia, does not mention the Kunda people.[1]

Silva Porto on his 1852 expedition mentions the Kunda people, “Where the Luangwa is crossed begins the territory of the Cunda.”[2]

David Livingstone during his 1868 visit to the Awemba country makes a sketch drawing of an “Akunda” person with facial tribal markings.[3]

The Kunda people were part of the later migrations from the Congo basin after the collapse of the Luba and Lunda kingdoms.

According to Marten and Kula (2007:298)[4] the majority of the languages in Zambia are Bantu languages and most of them are as a result of the slow processes of migration, language contact, and language shift which begun in present-day Nigeria and Cameroon around 300 BC going eastwards to East Africa and southwards to the Congo basin and Southern Africa by the Eighteenth Century. As they migrated south, they split even further into smaller groups. 
[1] de Lacerda e Almeida, Francisco José (1798). Instructions and Travel Diary that Governor Francisco Joze de Lacerda e Almeida Wrote about His Travel to the Center of Africa, Going to the River of Sena, in the Year of 1798. Retrieved 2022-09-18

[2] https://traditionalzambia.home.blog/tribes-of-zambia/second-bantu-invasion/luba/kunda-2/. Retrieved 2022-09-18

[3] David Livingstone Field Diary VI, 24 October-23 December 1866. Digital Catalogue Record | Livingstone Online. Retrieved 2022-09-18

[4] Marten L. and Kula N.C. Zambia: One Zambia, One Nation, Many Languages

Kunda tales and legends

The Kunda people, like many other Africa tribes, have folktales that talk about their origins. There are a number of hallmarks in these tales about the origins of the Kunda people that the Kunda do not miss. Whenever Kunda people tell legends about their origins, they never miss to say three things: that they came from ‘ku Uluba’ (Luba Kingdom), ‘kwa Chaŵala Makumba’ (from Chaŵala Makumba's Kingdom) under the leadership of Mambwe, their revered great leader during the migration, who led them from the Congo basin to their present settlement in the mid Luangwa valley (which they fondly call Malambo).

One such story is narrated by Kunda elders at their annual traditional ceremony, the Malaila -  a victory celebration which commemorates how Mambwe, their leader during migration, protected them from wild beasts on their way from Luba Kingdom in the Congo and after settling in Malambo (the Luangwa Valley).

According to Kunda oral history, a Luba king by the name of Chaŵala Makumba ordered that all boys were to be killed as soon as they are born. So, because of his oppressive rule, people began to flee from the Luba Kingdom heading south into what is now called Zambia

According to Chaplin (1957:15), [2] a Luba king by the name of Chaŵala Makumba ordered that all boys were to be killed as soon as they were born. Because of his oppressive rule, people began to flee from the Luba Kingdom heading south into what is now called Zambia:

"A chief named Chabala-Makumba or Mnengulube ruled the Ansenga at a place called Urubah. Being jealous, he ordered that all baby boys should be killed at birth; one         woman defied the law but being betrayed ran off with her son who was called Mambwe. When the boy grew to manhood, he became the leader of people who escaped from the harsh chief. As they travelled, they came to the Luangwa River which they crossed easily because Mambwe took his magic tail and struck the water to make a dry path, and the name of that place was called Pakaimba. After this he committed adultery with his sister and all the other leaders told him that for that he must be called Mukunda, and the people who followed him were called Akunda. Shortly afterwards Mambwe left the main tribe and went north-eastwards to found his own small tribe of the Akunda."

Ohannessian and Kashoki (1978)[3], cited by Marten and Kula (2007:293),[4] in the survey of Zambian languages says that the Kunda people belong to the language and dialect cluster with the Aushi, Chishinga, Kabende, Mukulu, Ngumbo, Twa, Unga, Bemba, Bwile, Luunda, Shila, Tabwa (Northern province) Bisa, Kunda (border of Northern and Eastern provinces) Lala, Ambo, Luano, Swaka (Eastern and Central provinces) Lamba, Lima (Copperbelt and Central provinces).
[1] Field A. Visiilano (Translation from Kunda to English is mine).

[2] Chaplin, J. H. A note on the brother-sister relationship in northern Rhodesia.

[3] Ohannessian S. and Kashoki M. E. Language in Zambia

[4] Ibid

Kunda Royal Establishment 
There are six Kunda chiefdoms under the Kunda chiefs namely: HRH Senior Chief Nsefu (also called Mambwe), HRH Chief Malama, HRH Chief Msoro, HRH Chief Mnkhanya, HRH Chief Kakumbi and HRH Chief Jumbe.

Kunda Language

 Field (1949:2),[1] says long time ago there were fewer tribes, later these tribe begun to divide among themselves to be the Chewa, the Nsenga, the Lala, the Bisa, the Ambo and the Kunda were one tribe and shared a common ancestry, they all came from Chaŵala Makumba. She tells a folktale of how some of these tribes divided:

“All the three chiefs were on the roof top of the house. One said, 'Bring me an axe (nkwangwa).' But some people   doubted, saying, 'Maybe he wants izembe (an axe), some said, 'Does he need katemo (an axe)?' Again another chief said, 'Bring me matika (mud); ' and people murmured amongst themselves, saying, ' He needs matipa (mud), some said, 'No, he needs matope (mud).' Thirdly they heard the words of one of the chiefs saying, 'I want lusisi (fibre);' again people did not know, some said, 'He wants nzizi (fibre);' some said, 'He wants maluzi (fibre).' Now all the chiefs came down from the roof top, they said, ‘All of you who say, 'Nkwangwa, Matope and Maluzi follow Undi, because you are Chewas. And you who say, Katemo, Matika and Nzizi,' follow Kalindawalo; You are Nsengas. And you who say, 'Izembe, Matipa and Lusisi,' follow Mambwe, you are Kundas."

 The Kunda Language is one of the seventy-two (72) ethnic tribes and dialects officially recognized by the government of the Republic of Zambia. However, due to many similarities with the Nsenga language or even Chewa, some publications like the Ethnologue have erroneously listed it as a dialect of these two languages.
 Over time the Kunda language, like any other living language, has undergone changes due to influences from languages that surround it. The change of the Kunda language is more evident when one listens to one Kunda variety called Chiŵetwe which is still spoken in Nsefu chiefdom, and compare this with the Kunda varieties that are spoken in other parts of the Kunda-land. It is a dialect of Bisa. Kundas sometimes refer to Chiŵetwe as ‘real Kunda’ or as a more ‘authentic Kunda’.
 Tribes that surround the Kundas are the Nsenga, the Chewa, the Ngoni, the Ambo and the Bisa. Apart from Chiŵiza (Bisa) which is very much similar to Chiŵetwe, two languages, Chinsenga and Chichewa, have had the most influence on the Kunda language. This could mainly be because these tribes have had important literature like Bibles and school readers written in their languages.
 This could be because, “By the end of the Twentieth Century, the two tribes had intermarried such that it is hard to find men with true Nsenga or Kunda blood”[1]. ----[1] Barret, D.B., 1971, African Initiatives in Religion, East African Pub. House, Nairobi.
 The above-mentioned factors have accelerated the creation of a middle-of-the-way Kunda language variety loosely referred to by the many as Kunda-Nsenga. This term refers to a mixture of Nsenga and Kunda a variety which has become the lingua franca of Kunda-land. 
 However, recent studies show that, although it shares a larger percentage in terms of similarity with these languages, it is a language distinct from Chinsenga or Chichewa. 
 A word study of these languages, although it is like looking for a needle in a hay sack, is therefore important in understanding the differences and uniqueness of these two languages:

Table 1.

 According to the Ethnologue [1], for a language to qualify to be called a dialect of another language, it has to show 85% or more lexical similarity. But results of wordlists collected in different parts of Kunda land, in a recently conducted linguistic survey by PIBT (2013)[2], shows that although Nsenga shares a lot of lexical similarities (72.6%) with the Kunda language, more than any other language, it does not reach the 85% threshold that may warrant it to be called a dialect of the Nsenga language. Therefore, it should be considered as language separate and distinct from Nsenga and Chewa. 

[1] Ibid

[2] PIBT, Kunda Linguistic Survey Report.

 There is little published materials in the Kunda language. As a result, the Kunda people have been mistakenly identified with other ethnic groups and due to contact with other languages, the Kunda language has suffered negatively and is in danger of dying.

Classification 

 In Guthrie's (1967) classification of Bantu languages, Kunda is placed in Zone N, group 42 and hence coded as N.42 (in the Senga-Sena Group)
 In the Ethnologue, Kunda  listed as 15, one of the two languages with the same name: ISO 639-3 [kdn]
 In the Glottologue, Kunda is listed as:

[Glottocode: kund1254]

 The best group it can be classified in is Guthrie's M.51/52 Lala-Bisa-Lamba Group:

Niger-Congo (1553)
Atlantic-Congo (1454)
Volta-Congo (1382)
Benue-Congo (989)
Bantoid (702)
Southern (680)
Narrow Bantu (548)
Central (354)
M (28)
Lala-Bisa-    Lamba (M.55) (1)
Kunda tribe of Mambwe District, Eastern Zambia (M.51/52).

Other Comment
 Distinct from Kunda dialect of Lusengo [lse], the Kunda [kdn] of Zimbabwe, Luangwa (Zambia) and Mozambique in Senga-Sena group, the Kunda dialect of Chichewa [nya], and Konda [lol] dialect or language in Mongo group.

References

 Guthrie's classification of Bantu languages (2022) [* https://brill.com/fileasset/downloads_products/35125_Bantu-New-updated-Guthrie-List.pdf]
 Traditional Zambia Blog (2022). [*https://traditionalzambia.home.blog/tribes-of-zambia/second-bantu-invasion/luba/kunda-2/]

External links

 Kunda page, from Ethnologue
 Malaila traditional ceremony, Lusaka Times

Further reading
 Zemba, Mercy (2015). "A grammatical sketch of Kunda Language". University of Zambia MA dissertation. (Description.)
 Banda D. et al. (2013). , from the Kunda Survey Report by Partners in Bible Translation

Ethnic groups in Zambia